As Primaveras (in ) is a 1859 poetry book by Brazilian Romantic poet Casimiro de Abreu. It was the last book written by Abreu, before his death from tuberculosis in 1860. It is considered his masterpiece.

The book's publication was financed by Casimiro's father, José Joaquim Marques de Abreu, although he disapproved of Casimiro's vocation as a writer.

Structure
As Primaveras is divided in five parts: the Introduction, "Livro Primeiro" ("Book the First"), "Livro Segundo" ("Book the Second"), "Livro Terceiro" ("Book the Third") and "Livro Negro" ("Black Book"). The poems speak mostly of romantic love, longing for childhood and death, nationalism, nostalgia and homesickness.

The most famous poem of the book is "Meus oito anos" ("When I was eight").

External links

Brazilian poetry collections
1859 books
Romanticism